Meyer v. Holley, 537 U.S. 280 (2003), was a case in which the Supreme Court of the United States held that the Fair Housing Act imposes strict liability on residential real estate corporations for racial discrimination, but the officers and owners of the corporation generally will not be held vicariously liable for offenses committed by the corporation's employees of agents. In a unanimous opinion written by Justice Stephen Breyer, the Court held that the Fair Housing Act "imposes liability without fault upon the employer in accordance with traditional agency principles, i. e., it normally imposes vicarious liability upon the corporation but not upon its officers or owners."

See also
 List of United States Supreme Court cases
 List of United States Supreme Court cases, volume 537
 List of United States Supreme Court cases by the Rehnquist Court

References

External links

United States Supreme Court cases
United States Supreme Court cases of the Rehnquist Court
2003 in United States case law